Allyl bromide (3-bromopropene) is an organic halide. It is an alkylating agent used in synthesis of polymers, pharmaceuticals, synthetic perfumes and other organic compounds. Physically, allyl bromide is a colorless liquid with an irritating and persistent smell, however, commercial samples are yellow or brown. Allyl bromide is more reactive but more expensive than allyl chloride, and these considerations guide its use.

Preparation 
Allyl bromide is produced commercially from allyl alcohol and hydrobromic acid:
CH2=CHCH2OH + HBr → CH2=CHCH2Br + H2O
It can also be prepared by the halogen-exchange reaction between allyl chloride and hydrobromic acid or by the allylic bromination of propene.

Reactions and uses

Electrophilic properties 
Allyl bromide is an electrophilic alkylating agent. It reacts with nucleophiles, such as amines, carbanions, alkoxides, etc., to introduce the allyl group:
CH2=CHCH2Br + Nu− → CH2=CHCH2Nu + Br− (Nu− is a nucleophile)
It is used in the synthesis of compounds containing the allyl functionality, such as the pharmaceuticals methohexital, secobarbital and thiamylal.

Preparation of Grignard reagent 
Allyl bromide reacts with magnesium metal in dry ether to form allylmagnesium bromide, a Grignard reagent:
CH2=CHCH2Br + Mg → CH2=CHCH2MgBr

References

External links 
 Entry at chemicalland21.com

Organobromides
Allyl compounds